The Ho-Am Prize in Mass Communication was an annual award in South Korea. It was given to people or groups who furthered mass media or communications in a way which was to the "enhancement of the welfare of mankind". It was one of the inaugural Ho-Am Prizes, established in 1991 along with the Prize in Science, Prize in Medicine, and Prize in Community Service, but was discontinued after 1996.

Winners of the Ho-Am Prize in Mass Communication:

 1991: MBC-TV Documentary Team
 1992: Ho-Min Yang
 1993: Chang-Bong Choi
 1994: Kun-Ho Song
 1995: no award
 1996: Chang-Yul Kim

Awards established in 1991
Awards disestablished in 1996
South Korean awards
Mass media in South Korea
Mass media awards
Samsung
1991 establishments in South Korea